This is a list of events in Scottish television from 1959.

Events

8 October – Scottish Television presents the first Scottish coverage of the General Election.

Television series
Scotsport (1957–2008)
The White Heather Club (1958–1968)

Births
12 January – Nick Nairn, celebrity chef
18 March – Janice Hally, playwright and screenwriter
27 August – Siobhan Redmond, actress
September – Gillian McKeith, nutritionist and television presenter
7 September – Rona Munro, writer
30 November – Lorraine Kelly, television presenter

See also
1959 in Scotland

References

 
Television in Scotland by year
1950s in Scottish television